The Seattle Majestics are a women's American football team based in Seattle, Washington.  The Seattle Majestics play in the WNFC.  Home games are played at French Field on the campus of Kent Meridian High School in Kent, Washington.

The team began as the Tacoma Majestics in 2002 before moving to Seattle in 2006 and merging with the former Women's American Football League franchise, the Seattle Warbirds.

The franchise is currently owned by Scott McCarron.  Sponsorships and fundraising under the team's non-profit 501c3 status provide finances for the team, but players also have to contribute.

The Seattle Majestics have won the WFA's Pacific Northwest Division title four times, 2013, 2014, 2015, and 2016. The Seattle Majestics also won the IWFL's Northwest Division title six times, from 2003 to 2005 and again from 2007 from 2009.  The team has also had the distinction of entertaining the crowd at Qwest Field prior to the kickoff of the Seattle Seahawks and has been featured on ESPN. After the conclusion of the 2017 season, the Seattle Majestics moved back to the IWFL.

Season-by-season

|-
| colspan="6" align="center" | Tacoma Majestics (IWFL)
|-
|2003 || 7 || 1 || 0 || 1st WC Pacific Northwest || Lost Western Conference Qualifier (Sacramento)
|-
|2004 || 8 || 0 || 0 || 1st WC Pacific Northwest || Lost Western Conference Qualifier (Sacramento)
|-
|2005 || 9 || 1 || 0 || 1st WC Pacific Northwest || Won Western Conference Qualifier (Chicago)Lost Western Conference Championship (Sacramento)
|-
| colspan="6" align="center" | Seattle Majestics (IWFL)
|-
|2006 || 5 || 3 || 0 || 2nd WC Pacific Northwest || --
|-
|2007 || 8 || 0 || 0 || 1st WC Pacific Northwest || Lost Western Conference Qualifier (Sacramento)
|-
|2008 || 8 || 0 || 0 || 1st Tier I WC Pacific Northwest || Won Western Conference Semifinal (Corvallis)Lost Western Conference Championship (Dallas)
|-
|2009 || 8 || 0 || 0 || 1st Tier 1 WC Pacific Northwest || Lost Western Conference Semifinal (Chicago)
|-
|2010 || 2 || 6 || 0 || 6th Tier 1 WC Pacific West || --
|-
|2011 || 4 || 4 || 0 || 2nd Tier 1 WC Pacific West || Won Tier II Western Conference Semifinal (Madison)Won Tier II Western Conference Championship (Modesto)Won Tier II Championship (New England)
|-
|2012 || 6 || 2 || 0 || 1st Tier 1 WC Pacific West || Lost Western Conference Semifinal (Sacramento)
|-
| colspan="6" align="center" | Seattle Majestics (WFA)
|-
|2013 || 8 || 0 || 0 || 1st Northwest Division || --
|-
|2014 || 7 || 1 || 0 || 1st Northwest Division || Lost American Conference Semifinal (San Diego Surge)
|-
|2015 || 8 || 0 || 0 || 1st Northwest Division || Lost American Conference Semifinal (San Diego Surge)
|-
|2016 || 6 || 2 || 0 || 2nd Northwest Division || 
|-
|2017 || 7 || 1 || 0 || 1st Northwest Division || Tied for 1st Place in the Division
|-
| colspan="6" align="center" | Seattle Majestics (IWFL)
|-
|2018 || 5 || 1 || 0 || 2nd Pacific Division || Finished 0-2 in Best of The West Tournament (Las Vegas, NV)
|-
| colspan="6" align="center" | Seattle Majestics (WNFC)
|-
|2019 || 4 || 1 || 1 || 2nd Pacific Conference || Lost in Pacific Conference Championship (Utah Falconz)
|-
!Totals || 109 || 35 || 1
|colspan="2"| (including playoffs)

References

External links
Official site
Official Site of the Independent Women's Football League

American football in Seattle
Independent Women's Football League
Sports in Kent, Washington
American football teams  established in 2003
2003 establishments in Washington (state)
American football teams in Washington (state)
Women's sports in Washington (state)